Patrice Moore is a Canadian radio host. He was a political candidate for the House of Commons of Canada for the Bloc Québécois in the riding of Beauce in the 2006 Canadian federal election. He finished second behind the Conservative candidate, Maxime Bernier. He is currently the morning show host at CKRB-FM (COOL-FM) in Saint-Georges.

External links
 Patrice Moore's page at COOL-FM

Bloc Québécois candidates for the Canadian House of Commons
Candidates in the 2006 Canadian federal election
Canadian radio personalities
Living people
People from Sainte-Marie, Quebec
Year of birth missing (living people)